The NBA on Mutual is the de facto name for National Basketball Association radio broadcasts on the Mutual Broadcasting System. Mutual was the official national radio broadcaster of NBA games (including the All-Star Game and NBA Finals) from the 1968-69 through 1983-84 seasons. Mutual had previously broadcast NBA games as far back as 1954-55. Mutual was ultimately supplanted by the ABC Radio Network.

Commentators

Play-by-play
Bill Campbell
Skip Caray
Eddie Doucette
Jack Fleming
Chick Hearn
Tony Roberts
Joe Tait
Harry Wismer

Color commentators
Bob Blackburn
Hubie Brown
Art Eckman
Tom Heinsohn
Rod Hundley
Jim Karvellas
Andy Musser
Johnny Orr
Gene Peterson
Oscar Robertson

References

External links
Mutual had the NBA playoffs in the mid to late 70's, here's their promo for the 1979 playoffs (which SEATTLE won this time!!)

 

Mutual Broadcasting System programs
American sports radio programs
Mutual
1960s American radio programs
1970s American radio programs
1980s American radio programs